Mildred Coles may refer to one of several people:

 Mildred Coles (tennis) (1876-?), British tennis player
 Mildred Coles (actress) (1920 – 1995), American actress